Churhat is a town, near the town of Sidhi and a nagar panchayat in Sidhi district in the state of Madhya Pradesh, India.

Demographics
 India census, Churhat had a population of 13,102. Males constitute 54% of the population and females 46%. Churhat has an average literacy rate of 56%, lower than the national average of 59.5%: male literacy is 67% and, female literacy is 44%. In Churhat, 17% of the population is under 6 years of age.

Notable people
 Arjun Singh former Chief Minister of Madhya Pradesh
 Govind Prasad Mishra former Member of parliament from BJP 2009-2014
 Ajay Singh, former MLA Churahat, Indian National Congress party
 Arunoday Singh Bollywood actor and son of Ajay Arjun Singh
Amar Singh Baghel Youth Leader , Public Figure , Agriculturist

References

Cities and towns in Sidhi district